Boulder Creek is a stream in the U.S. state of South Dakota.

Boulder Creek derives its name from a nearby canyon noted for the boulders it contains.

See also
List of rivers of South Dakota

References

Rivers of Lawrence County, South Dakota
Rivers of South Dakota